Arabic Extended-A is a Unicode block encoding Qur'anic annotations and letter variants used for various non-Arabic languages.

Block

History
The following Unicode-related documents record the purpose and process of defining specific characters in the Arabic Extended-A block:

References

External links 
 Scheherazade, an extended Arabic script font designed by SIL International, distributed under the SIL Open Font License (OFL)
 Harmattan, an extended Arabic script font designed by SIL International for West Africa, distributed under the SIL Open Font License (OFL)

Unicode blocks